Mary Welander is an American politician serving as a member of the Connecticut House of Representatives from the 114th district. Elected in November 2020, she assumed office on January 6, 2021.

Education 
Welander earned a Bachelor of Arts degree from the University of Massachusetts Amherst.

Career 
A resident of Orange, Connecticut, Welander served as a member of the Orange Board of Education in 2017, and served in the roles of Vice Chair for both the Finance subcommittee and the Policy, Personnel, and Transportation subcommittee. She was elected to the Connecticut House of Representatives in November 2020 and assumed office on January 6, 2021. She also serves as vice chair of the House Children Committee.

Personal life 
Welander and her husband, Matt, have three children. Matt is a professor at the Yale School of Drama.

References 

Living people
University of Massachusetts Amherst alumni
People from Orange, Connecticut
People from New Haven County, Connecticut
Democratic Party members of the Connecticut House of Representatives
Women state legislators in Connecticut
Year of birth missing (living people)